Birchard is a surname. Notable people with the surname include:
 Joseph Birchard (1673–1755), American politician
 Matthew Birchard (1804–1876), American jurist
 May Birchard (died 1968), Canadian municipal politician and poverty activist
 Paul Birchard, American actor
 Ross Matthew Birchard alias Hudson Mohawke (born 1986), Scottish musician, producer and DJ
 Shannon Birchard (born 1994), Canadian curler

See also
 Birchard Letter, a public letter from Abraham Lincoln to Matthew Birchard and eighteen other Ohio Democrats (1863)
 Rutherford Birchard Hayes (1822–1893), 19th president of the United States (1877 to 1881)